Tenczyn  is a village in the administrative district of Gmina Lubień, within Myślenice County, Lesser Poland Voivodeship, in southern Poland.

The village has a population of 1,900.

References

Tenczyn